Lake Tapps is a reservoir in Pierce County, Washington. It was created in 1911 by Puget Sound Power & Light and operated for hydroelectric power until it ceased power production in 2004.  In December 2009 PSE sold the reservoir to the Cascade Water Alliance, a municipal corporation whose members are five King County cities (Bellevue, Issaquah, Kirkland, Redmond, and Tukwila) and two water and sewer districts (Sammamish Plateau Water and Sewer District, and the Skyway Water and Sewer District). Cascade provides drinking water to more than 350,000 residents and more than 20,000 businesses.  It plans to eventually use Lake Tapps as a municipal water supply source for customers of its members.

Cascade has signed an agreement with the Lake Tapps homeowners that guarantees full recreational reservoir levels throughout the summer.  It has also signed an agreement with the Muckleshoot Indian Tribe and the Puyallup Tribe of Indians to ensure instream flows for fish.  Cascade worked with the four cities that surround the reservoir, Auburn, Bonney Lake, Buckley and Sumner, to ensure their future water needs will be met for about 50 years. Cascade is the operator of Lake Tapps. Key elements of these agreements were incorporated into state water rights issued to Cascade in 2010.

The local terrain is such that the shape of the shoreline is very complex, with many inlets, peninsulas, and islands. Before the reservoir was created there were several smaller lakes, including one called Lake Tapps. The reservoir is held in place by a series of dikes. The reservoir is also known to hold many fish including carp, smallmouth bass, perch, and tiger musky.

A diversion dam on the White River, near Buckley, routes water into a flume which empties into the east side of Lake Tapps. Although there is no longer power generation, the water is still diverted and returned to the river through the former hydropower infrastructure.

The level of the reservoir is lowered from about October to April to allow important upkeep and maintenance to be done, as well as an occasional major capital project.  The winter lowering of the reservoir levels also ensures the safety of dikes from wind, waves and storms.

At the diversion structure on the White River the US Army Corps of Engineers is undertaking a project to replace the 100 plus year old barrier and 70 plus year old fish trap and haul facility.  This project will allow the Corps to move endangered salmon and bull trout, as well as other species, above its Mud Mountain Dam facility. The project began in mid-2018 and is expected to be completed in 2023.

Lake Tapps is often considered a city or census-designated place in its own right, although it shares a zip code (98391) with the Bonney Lake post office.  However, the majority of the area surrounding the reservoir is in unincorporated Pierce County; the rest is part of the city of Bonney Lake. At the northern edge of Lake Tapps is Auburn.

References

External links

Bonney Lake & Lake Tapps Courier-Herald - Current articles
Lake Tapps News
Lake Tapps Public Water Supply Project
Cascade Water Alliance
Historic American Engineering Record (HAER) documentation, filed under Dieringer, Pierce County, WA:

Historic American Engineering Record in Washington (state)
Lakes of Pierce County, Washington
Reservoirs in Washington (state)
Protected areas of Pierce County, Washington